Astrid Assefa, born Astrid Margaretha Engelbrektsson, is an Ethiopian-Swedish singer, actress and theater director. She was born on February 7, 1953, in Arvika, a locality and the seat of Arvika Municipality in Värmland County of Sweden. She is best known for her acting appearances in Cool Kids Don't Cry (2014), Stockholm East (2011) and 30:e November (1995).

Career 
Born in 1953 in Sweden, Assefa studied at the state stage school in Gothenburg and has been involved with the Royal Dramatic Theatre, The Riksteatern (Sweden's largest tour theater), the Folkeatern in Gävle and Stockholm City Theatre. She worked as a theater teacher at the University of Addis Ababa in Ethiopia, the country of her origin. She served as head of the Dalateatern theater in Falun and became chairman of the board of The Dramatic Institute, now Stockholm Drama College. She once served as an expert on the State Investigation Immigration Policy Committee. She also participated as a guest in Allsång på Skansen, an all-song program in Stockholm broadcast in Swedish Television almost every summer since August 3, 1979. In 2005 Assefa debuted on "Summer on P1", a program on Sweden's Radio P1 broadcast every summer.

References

1953 births
Living people
People from Arvika Municipality
Swedish people of Ethiopian descent
Swedish actresses
Swedish women singers
Swedish theatre directors
Women theatre directors